= Amarok Society =

- Formation: 1992
- Founder: Dr. Tanyss Munro and G.E.M. Munro
- Type: Charity
- Location: Canada, Asia, Africa
- Services: Educational programs
- Key people: Dr. Tanyss Munro, G.E.M. Munro
- Affiliations: Rotary Club of Belleville, Rotary Club of Dhaka Mid-Town

Amarok Society is a Canadian charity operating in Asia and Africa. Incorporated as a federally registered charity in 1992, it was founded by Dr. Tanyss Munro and her husband, G.E.M. Munro, a noted writer, as a support to their efforts to improve educational opportunity for Aboriginal and First Nations students. To avoid appearances of conflict of interest, Amarok Society suspended its activities when Dr. Munro was appointed Senior Advisor to the Minister of Indian Affairs under Prime Minister Jean Chrétien. The charity was revived to support the Munros' creation of educational programs in South Asia in partnership with Baridhara Mohila Samobaya Samity, Ltd., the largest women's organization in South Asia. Amarok Society's programs, 'Mothers of Intentions Projects', are unusual in that, in the absence of affordable educational opportunities, they train very poor mothers to be family and neighbourhood teachers.

Significant support for Amarok Society comes from Rotary Clubs. It has a formal relationship with the Rotary Club of Belleville, Ontario, Canada and with the Rotary Club of Dhaka Mid-Town, Bangladesh, and is supported by many other Rotary Clubs in North America and the United Kingdom.

Additional support has come from the sale of a book written by G.E.M. Munro, "South Asian Adventures with the Active Poor", which gained best-seller status in Canada.

A documentary film, "Heart to Head: How Amarok Society Women are Teaching the World's Poorest Children", was completed in early 2014.

In 2013, the Munros were awarded Queen Elizabeth II Diamond Jubilee Medals in recognition of the work of Amarok Society.
